William Peel may refer to:

Sir William Peel (Royal Navy officer) (1824–1858), Royal Navy officer and recipient of the Victoria Cross in the Crimean War
William Peel (bishop) (1854–1916), Anglican bishop in Africa
Sir William Peel (colonial administrator) (1875–1945), British Chief Secretary of the Federated Malay States and Governor of Hong Kong
William Peel, 1st Earl Peel (1867–1937), British politician
William Peel, 3rd Earl Peel (born 1947), cross-bench (non-party) member of the House of Lords and Lord Chamberlain of the Royal Household
William Yates Peel (1789–1858), British Tory politician